Otwock  is a city in east-central Poland, some  southeast of Warsaw, with 44,635 inhabitants (2019). Otwock is a part of the Warsaw Agglomeration. It is situated on the right bank of Vistula River below the mouth of Swider River. Otwock is home to a unique architectural style called Swidermajer.

Otwock is situated in the Masovian Voivodship since 1999; previously, it was in Warszawa Voivodship (1975–1998). It is the capital of Otwock County. Forested areas make up 23% of the territory.

History

Even though the first mention of a village called Otwosko comes from the early 15th century, Otwock did not fully develop until the second half of the 19th century, when in 1877 the Vistula River Railroad was opened, which ran from Mława via Warsaw, to Lublin and Chełm. Otwock, which is located along the line, became a popular suburb, with numerous spas and several notable guests, including Józef Piłsudski and Władysław Reymont, who wrote his Nobel prize-winning novel Chłopi there. In 1916, Otwock was incorporated as a town and became the seat of a powiat. In 1936 railway connection Warsaw - Otwock was electrified as the first rail line in Poland.

World War II

Following the Nazi–Soviet Invasion of Poland in December 1939, the German authorities established a Jewish ghetto in Otwock. A murderous Action T4 euthanasia program was carried out by the Nazis in the local Zofiówka Sanatorium for the psychiatric patients in order to confine its Jewish population for the purpose of persecution and exploitation. The Ghetto was liquidated between August and 19 September 1942, when 75% of its Jewish population of 12,000–15,000 numbering at around 8,000 were assembled by the Nazis at a layover yard in Otwock (pictured) and transported in cattle trucks to extermination camps in Treblinka and Auschwitz. Jews who remained were summarily shot at Reymonta Street soon after. 

Otwock is the hometown of Irena Sendler (1910 – 2008), the Polish humanitarian who saved thousands of Jewish children during the Holocaust; as well as Krystyna Dańko, both awarded the titles of Righteous among the Nations by Yad Vashem. Writer Calel Perechodnik, a Jewish Ghetto Policeman from Otwock also hailed from this town. Following the liberation, a children's home for Holocaust survivors was established in Otwock.

Economy
In 1958, Ewa, the first Polish nuclear reactor was activated in Swierk district of Otwock. A second research reactor, Maria, was erected in 1974.

Otwock is home to a sports club Start Otwock (founded in 1924). The club is renowned for its weight-lifters such as Szymon Kołecki and Marcin Dołęga. Also, the Start Club's own prodigy is football forward Janusz Żmijewski who in the 1960s played for Legia Warszawa and the national team of Poland.

International relations

Twin towns – Sister cities
Otwock is twinned with:
  Lennestadt, Germany
  Saint-Amand-Montrond, France

See also
Świdermajer – The characteristic architectural style of the area

References

External links
  Town of Otwock, official website
  Otwock info site including local news
  Młody Otwock - The Young Otwock [organization], Otwock culture. Events
  Otwock Photo Gallery
  Photo gallery
 Jewish Community in Otwock on Virtual Shtetl
 

Cities and towns in Masovian Voivodeship
Otwock County
Masovian Voivodeship (1526–1795)
Warsaw Governorate
Warsaw Voivodeship (1919–1939)
Holocaust locations in Poland